Diloxia belohalis is a species of snout moth in the genus Diloxia. It was described by Hubert Marion and Pierre Viette in 1956 and is known from Beloha, Madagascar, from which its specific epithet is derived.

References

Moths described in 1956
Pyralinae
Moths of Madagascar
Moths of Africa